Stephen Hoyle (born 6 November 1992) is an English footballer who plays as a forward for New Zealand club Eastern Suburbs.

Hoyle has played football in four different confederations, at clubs in England and Scotland in Europe, New Zealand in Oceania, Australia in Asia, and Canada in North America.

Club career

Early career
As a youngster, Hoyle trained at England's FA Academy and with his hometown club Barnsley. He also spent time with the Doncaster Rovers youth side and at the University of Stirling in Scotland. He was converted from a defender to a midfielder during his earlier career.

Hoyle's first stint abroad was in New Zealand with Napier City Rovers and Hawke's Bay United, where he scored a goal in the New Zealand Football Championship playoffs. He then joined Canadian side Toronto Lynx in the Premier Development League, effectively an American fourth division, in 2013. He appeared in five matches for the club, tallying two assists without scoring, and underwent a trial with Toronto FC under then-manager Ryan Nelsen, a New Zealander.

Return to New Zealand
Hoyle returned to New Zealand and became a striker at the start of the 2015-16 season with WaiBOP United. He ranked among the top 10 goalscorers in the Premiership for four straight seasons from 2015 to 2019, and was Canterbury United's top scorer in the 2017–18 and 2018-19 season.

Valour FC
Hoyle signed for Winnipeg side Valour FC in the newly launched Canadian Premier League ahead of the 2019 season. He was the second signing in club history and the first international signing for head coach Rob Gale. He scored the first ever goal for the club in its first competitive game, a 2–1 win away to Pacific FC at Westhills Stadium in Langford, BC on 1 May 2019, before being substituted in the second half. He left Valour by mutual consent on 9 July 2019.

Eastern Suburbs
Hoyle returned to New Zealand ahead of the 2019–20 NZ Premiership season and signed with defending champions Eastern Suburbs.

Personal life
Hoyle's girlfriend Jill is a New Zealander, and he took up residency during his time in the country. His younger brother James plays as a defender for New Zealand side Hamilton Wanderers. The brothers were teammates at Napier City Rovers and WaiBOP United.

Honours

Club
Napier City Rovers
Central Premier League: 2012 & 2015

Individual
WaiBOP United
Fans' Player of the Year: 2015-16

Canterbury United
Mainland Striker of the Year: 2017-18
Mainland Player of the Year: 2017-18

References

External links
 

1992 births
Living people
Association football forwards
English footballers
Footballers from Barnsley
English expatriate footballers
Expatriate association footballers in New Zealand
English expatriate sportspeople in New Zealand
Expatriate soccer players in Canada
English expatriate sportspeople in Canada
Expatriate soccer players in Australia
English expatriate sportspeople in Australia
Napier City Rovers FC players
Hawke's Bay United FC players
Toronto Lynx players
WaiBOP United players
Canterbury United players
Valour FC players
Eastern Suburbs AFC players
Northern Premier League players
New Zealand Football Championship players
USL League Two players
National Premier Leagues players
Canadian Premier League players